Winston Holt "Win" Charles (September 26, 1903 – January 29, 1949) was a professional American football player for the American Professional Football Association's Dayton Triangles. He played in five games in the 1928 season. Charles played college football at William & Mary. He was shot to death on January 29, 1949. His wife, Ivy Patterson Charles, was convicted of his murder on May 11, 1949 and sentenced to serve six years. She was denied a pardon by Governor Tuck on October 14, 1949.

References

External links
NFL.com profile

1903 births
1949 deaths
Dayton Triangles players
William & Mary Tribe football players
People murdered in Virginia
Mariticides